Pseudosphenoptera chrysorrhoea is a moth in the subfamily Arctiinae. It is found in Brazil.

References
Notes

Sources
Natural History Museum Lepidoptera generic names catalog

Arctiinae